William Joseph Scully (March 19, 1889–May 1, 1949), sometimes credited as William Scully, "W. J. Scully", or "Bill Scully", was an American director and production manager.  William Scully was born in New York City and died in Hollywood, California.

Filmography

Director
Annabel Lee (1921)
Cuando el amor ríe (1931)

Assistant Director 
My Son, the Hero (1943)
Rosalie (1937)
On the Avenue (1937)
Born to Dance (1936)
Private Number (1936)
Broadway Melody of 1936 (1935)
Born to Be Bad (1934)
If I Had a Million (1932)
The Last of the Duanes (1930)
Hell's Angels (1930)
Paris Bound (1929)
Tenth Avenue (1928)
The Blue Danube (1928)
Turkish Delight (1927)
His Dog (1927)
The Clinging Vine (1926)
Eve's Leaves (1926)
Made for Love (1926)
The Coming of Amos (1925)
Greater Than Fame (1920)
The Country Cousin (1919)
A Society Exile (1919)
The Avalanche (1919)
The Reason Why (1918)
Her Better Self (1917)

Production Manager

Gone with the Wind (1939)

External links

1889 births
1949 deaths
Film directors from New York City